L90 may refer to:

 Ocotillo Airport (FAA LID: L90), in Ocotillo Wells, California, U.S.
 HMS Ledbury (L90), an escort destroyer
 Sydney bus route 190X, previously known as route L90, in Australia
 Aermacchi M-290 RediGO, originally known as L-90 TP Redigo, a trainer aircraft
 Renault L90, a car manufactured by Renault Pars
 LG L90 Dual, a smartphone running Optimus UI